The following is largely a link to lists of notable people who left Christianity, sorted by the religious or non-religious ideology they switched to:

By former Christian denomination 
List of former Catholics
List of former Jesuits
List of former or dissident LDS (Mormons)
List of former Protestants

By newly adopted religion or irreligion 
List of converts to the Bahá'í Faith from Christianity
List of converts to Buddhism from Christianity
List of converts to Hinduism from Christianity
List of converts to Islam from Christianity
List of converts to Judaism from Christianity
List of converts to Sikhism from Christianity
List of converts to nontheism from Christianity

Miscellaneous 
This section is due to the existence of former Christians who do not fit existing lists of former Christians, either because their current faith is indeterminate or is not dealt with by the above lists. 
 
Brigitte Boisselier – mostly known for her association with Clonaid, converted to Raëlism
Bart Campolo – former pastor and son of pastor Tony Campolo; as he is described as "secular humanist" he may fit the nontheist list, but has not precisely stated his view of theism
Tom Cruise – American actor and well-known Scientologist
Jenna Elfman – American actress who converted to Scientology
Katy Perry – musician with five platinum records, daughter of Pentecostal pastors
Charles M. Schulz – taught Sunday School at one time, but later identified as Secular humanist, although his widow indicates he maintained a belief in God.
John Travolta – actor raised Catholic who converted to Scientology
Neville Wadia – Anglo-Indian businessman of an old Parsi family, but raised Christian before converting to his ancestors' Zoroastrianism; this caused some controversy as orthodox Parsee clergy do not believe in converting to Zoroastrianism

See also

Apostasy in Christianity
List of converts to Christianity

References

Christian
Former